Bolivar is a ghost town located in Monroe County, Mississippi, United States.

Bolivar appeared on a map of Mississippi from 1831, and was located on a road midway between Hamilton and Cotton Gin Port.

The New Hope Primitive Baptist Church was located there, and there may have also been one store.

References

Former populated places in Monroe County, Mississippi
Former populated places in Mississippi